Francesco Biancamano (born March 12, 1976) is a former professional athlete and American football player who arrived to the United States in the early 1980s.

Early life 
Biancamano, the son of Vincenzo and Vincenza Biancamano, immigrants from Sassano, Italy, arrived in the United States in the late 1970s. Growing up in Huntington Station, New York, Biancamano didn't start playing football until his sophomore year and track and field till his senior year for Walt Whitman High School. Played wide receiver, corner, punter / kicker his senior year and averaged over 40 yards per kick for head coach Rich Cariddi. Biancamano received multiple offers from Division I, IAA, II, universities to play football and run track.

Biancamano attended Southern Connecticut State University (SCSU), where he majored in sports medicine and exercise physiology. A four-year starter for the SCSU Owls as a kicker/punter and a 4-year long/triple jumper, Biancamano holds multiple school records in Football and Track and Field.

Professional career
After college, Biancamano played in the National Football League (NFL) with the New York Giant (Preseason), Denver Broncos (Preseason), Dallas Cowboys (Preseason),Cleveland Browns (Preseason), also 2 seasons in NFL Europe for the Amsterdam Admirals (1999–2000) and drafted 294th overall by the San Francisco Demons in the XFL.

Records 
 Most punts, career: 231, (1994–98)
 Most punt yardage, career 8,987,(1994–98)
 Best punting average, season: 40.8, (1996)
 Best punting average, season: 40.1, (1997)
 Most punting Yards, season: 2,448, (1996)
 Most punting Yards, season: 2,447, (1995)
 Most punts, season: 61, (1997)
 Best net punting average: 40.1, (1996)
 Best punting average, game: 47.7, Frank Biancamano, vs. E. Stroudsburg, (1994)

Personal life 
Biancamano resides in Long Island with his wife Paige, two son's Vince and Lance and daughter Genevieve.

Post-playing career 
Biancamano is currently the founder of Biancamano Ventures and inventor of GhoStick.

References

External links 
 Francobiancamano
 Frankbiancamano
 Biancamano Ventures

1976 births
Living people
Italian players of American football
New York Giants players
Amsterdam Admirals players
American inventors